On May 13, 2017, two militants of the Baloch Liberation Army (BLA) riding on a motorcycle opened fire on group of laborers working in Gwadar, Balochistan, Pakistan. The road where these labourers were working was one of a network of connecting roads that form part of the China-Pakistan Economic Corridor (CPEC) project. The gunfire resulted in the death of 10 labourers. A spokesman for the BLA claimed responsibility of attack.

Shooting 
The two gunmen fired on labourers at Pishgan and Gant, which are 20 kilometres apart from each other. Eight labourers died on the spot. Two were severely injured and later died while they were being brought to hospital, raising the death toll to ten. According to an eyewitness, both gunmen came from the Pashkun area and they spoke in Balochi. A C-130 aircraft belonging to the Pakistan Air Force was used to fly the labourers to their native areas after the funeral which was offered in Senator Marwoon Ishaq Cricket ground at around 3 pm. Law enforcement agencies rushed to the site of the attack and started a search operation.

Victims 
Nine of the ten labourers were identified as: Muhammad Khan, Ali Dost, Shuban, Abdul Hakim, Rasool Bakhsh, Waheed, Zaheer and Sadam. The surviving worker was identified as Hazoor Bakhsh. All of the victims were Sindhi.

Reactions 
Chief Minister of Balochistan, Sanaullah Zehri condemned the attack saying, "“Such coward attacks can’t prevent development and prosperity in Gwadar and Balochistan".

References 

2017 murders in Pakistan
21st-century mass murder in Pakistan
Balochistan Liberation Army attacks
Terrorist incidents in Pakistan in 2017
Deaths by firearm in Balochistan, Pakistan
Massacres in Pakistan
Mass murder in 2017
Targeted killings in Pakistan
Mass shootings in Pakistan
2017 mass shootings in Asia
2017 in Balochistan, Pakistan
Attacks in Pakistan in 2017